The 1981 Asian Judo Championships were held at Jakarta, Indonesia in July.

Medal overview

Men's events

Women's events

Medals table

References
Judo Channel by Token Corporation

External links
 Judo Union of Asia

Asian Championships
Asian Judo Championships, 1981
Asian Judo Championships
Asian Judo Championships
1980s in Jakarta
Sport in Jakarta
Judo competitions in Indonesia